Gnommish is the "fairy language" used in the Artemis Fowl series by Eoin Colfer. It is not actually a language at all, but the English language encoded into a letter-substitution cipher where each symbol represents a letter. Lines of translatable Gnommish run along the bottoms of all the books in the series. However, in book one of the series, it is mentioned that one of the symbols was comparable to the Egyptian Anubis symbol. It is also mentioned that Gnommish is a mix of symbolic and alphabetic letters, running in spirals (but since reading in spirals gives most fairies migraines, most modern fairy script is arranged in horizontal lines).

Code 

A string of Gnommish symbols appears at the bottom of each page of Artemis Fowl. It comprises a substitution cipher which can be deciphered using sections of the book's text displayed in Gnommish, together with their English translations. A complete Gnommish cipher key can be found in The Artemis Fowl Files.

Unique words 
There are only five Gnommish words mentioned in the Artemis Fowl series. P'shóg is the Gnommish word for sprite, used in Book 1 by Artemis Fowl II while talking to the sprite in Ho Chi Minh City. He also uses the word ka-dalun, meaning fairy. D'Arvit is a Gnommish curse word. Book 1 declares after the first appearance of the word "D'Arvit" that, "There is no point translating that word as it would have to be censored." It is often used in the series to replace real profanity, likely to be in the place of a swearword. In the books it is often used by Commander Root, but also by other characters. In Book 6, Holly Short and Mulch Diggums share a quick conversation in Gnommish about Artemis, which included the Gnommish word "cowpóg" which translates as 'moron'. Commander Root tends to use these words often in the book.

In Book 7, the Gnommish name for the ship in the Atlantic Ocean is ffurforfer, pronounced 'fourfourfour'. It means 'plunderer'. Also it is revealed that in Gnommish, for a conversion from a verb (for example, plunder- ffurfor) to a noun (plunderer- ffuforfer), the suffix -fer is added. It is noted that this is similar to the English way of adding the suffix -er, hence implying that one was derived from the other.

Notes

External links
Gnommish from Omniglot
Gnommish from The Dictionary of Made-Up Languages
Artemis Fowl from Encyclopedia of Fictional and Fantastic Languages
Eoin Colfer's Magical Fairies  <Broken>
A Study on the Artemis Fowl Series in the Context of Publishing Success
Crossover Fiction: Global and Historical Perspectives

Artemis Fowl
Fictional languages
Constructed scripts in fiction